Thomas Herbst may refer to:

 Thomas Herbst (footballer) (born 1962), German football manager and player
 Thomas Herbst (painter) (1848–1915), German Impressionist painter